The 2011 Speedy Hire UK Open was the ninth year of the PDC darts tournament where, following numerous regional qualifying heats throughout Britain, players competed in a single elimination tournament to be crowned champion. The tournament was held at the Reebok Stadium in Bolton, England, between 2–5 June 2011, and has the nickname, "the FA Cup of darts", as a random draw is staged after each round until the final.

The title was won by James Wade, who defeated Wes Newton 11–8 in the final.

Format and qualifiers

2011 UK Open qualifiers
There were eight qualifying events staged in Barnsley and Wigan between February and May 2011 to determine the UK Open Order of Merit Table. The tournament winners were:

The six players above that won a qualifying tournament all finished in the Top 32 in the merit table and thus entered the main tournament at the third round stage.

The tournament featured 172 players. As in previous years, eight UK Open qualifiers were staged across the north of England, where players' winnings were collated into the UK Open Order of Merit. The top 32 players in the Order of Merit, who played a minimum of two events, received a place in the third round of the final tournament. In addition, the next 76 players in the Order of Merit qualified for the tournament, but needed to start in the earlier rounds played on the Thursday.
A further 64 players qualified via regional qualifying tournaments.

Top 32 in Order of Merit (receiving byes into third round)

Remaining Order of Merit qualifiers (starting in first and preliminary round)

Rileys qualifiers
32 players qualified from Rileys qualifiers held in Rileys Dart Zones across Britain.

Speedy qualifiers
32 players qualified from Speedy qualifiers held at four venues across Britain from 12 to 15 April.

Bristol
  Charlie Cooper
  Bruce Harrison
  Jon Jukes
  Martin Perring
  Darren Pugh
  Damien Sherwood
  Peter White
  Stuart White

Dartford
  Ian Covill
  Kevin Edwards
  John Keating
  John Kennedy
  Eddy Martin
  Craig Mucklow
  Jamie Robinson
  Conan Whitehead

Stoke-on-Trent
  Colin Appleton
  Andy Beardmore
  Paul Cartwright
  Stuart Daniels
  Robbie Green
  John Jackson
  Kevin Simm
  Brandon Walsh

Glasgow
  Charlie Burns
  John Donaldson
  Gordon Foster
  Kirk Gordon
  Duncan Hastings
  Danny Jones
  Tommy Little
  Ryan Murray

Prize money
For the third consecutive UK Open, the prize fund was £200,000.

Draw
The draw for the preliminary, first and second rounds was made on 12 May.

Thursday 2 June; best of 7 legs

Preliminary round

Stage 3

Stage 4

Stage 5

Stage 6

Stage 7

Stage 8

Round 1

Main Stage

Stage 2

 † Brandon Walsh received a bye as Mensur Suljović was disqualified.
 † Shaun Griffiths received a bye as John MaGowan withdrew due to injury.

Stage 3

Stage 4

Stage 5

Stage 6

Stage 7

Stage 8

Round 2

Main Stage

Stage 2

Stage 3

Stage 4

Stage 5

Stage 6

Stage 7

Stage 8

Friday 3 June; best of 17 legs

Round 3
Draw made after Round 2 matches

Main Stage

Stage 2

Stage 3

Stage 4

Stage 5

Stage 6

Stage 7

Stage 8

Saturday 4 June; best of 17 legs

Afternoon – Round 4
Draw made after Round 3 matches.

Main Stage

Stage 2

Stage 3

Stage 4

Evening – Round 5
Draw made after Round 4 matches

Main Stage

Stage 2

Sunday 5 June
These matches took place on the main stage.

Afternoon – Quarter-finals; best of 19 legs
Draw made after Round 5 matches.

Evening – Final 4
Draw made after the Quarter-finals.

See also
UK Open history of event and previous winners
2011 in darts includes extended results of Pro Tour events
PDC Pro Tour history of PDC "floor events"

References

External links
The official PDC page for the UK Open

UK Open
UK Open Darts
UK Open (darts)
Open (darts)
UK Open